Hoeryong Stadium is a stadium in Hoeryong, North Hamgyong Province, North Korea.

See also 

 List of football stadiums in North Korea

References

Sports venues in North Korea
Football venues in North Korea
Buildings and structures in North Hamgyong Province